James Cecil Parke won in the final 3–6, 6–3, 1–6, 6–1, 7–5, against Alfred Beamish to win the men's singles tennis title at the 1912 Australasian Championships.

Norman Brookes was the defending champion, but chose not to participate that year.

Draw

Draw

External links
 

 

Men's singles